The James River is located in Kimble and Mason Counties, in the U.S. state of Texas.  The Llano River in Mason County is the location of the mouth of the James River, and it flows southeast for  past the Kimble County ghost town of Noxville.  The river intersects with the James River Spring and with the Little Devils River in southeastern Kimble County. The valleys along the James River became sites for 19th-century European settlements. The river is a destination for outdoor enthusiasts of whitewater kayaking and rafting.

See also
List of rivers of Texas

References

Rivers of Texas
Rivers of Kimble County, Texas
Rivers of Mason County, Texas